Waterbug Records is a small independent record label based in Glen Ellyn, Illinois specializing in singer-songwriters and traditional folk musicians who do original research.  The label was founded as an artist cooperative label in 1992 by singer-songwriter Andrew Calhoun.  Calhoun described the label in a column written for Sing Out!: "Waterbug is largely an artists' co-op. All the artists own their recordings and publishing rights.   Twenty artists contributed a song and part of the cost of manufacturing a label sampler, which each of us sell from the stage for $5. We are working cooperatively to help each other get heard."

Roster
Geoff Bartley
Randy Black
Chuck Brodsky
Jonathan Byrd
Andrew Calhoun
Lui Collins
Erin Corday
Kat Eggleston
Bob Franke
Annie Gallup
Michael Jerling
Jenn Lindsay
Kate MacLeod
Kate McDonnell
Sarah McQuaid
Anaïs Mitchell
William Pint and Felicia Dale
Shinobu Sato
Danny Schmidt
Cosy Sheridan
Devon Sproule
Sons of the Never Wrong
Art Thieme
Sloan Wainwright
Dar Williams
Hugh Blumenfeld

See also 
 List of record labels

References

External links
Waterbug Recordsofficial site. 

Folk record labels
American independent record labels
Record labels established in 1992